Doncaster Rovers Soccer Club is an Australian soccer club based in Doncaster East, Melbourne. Founded in 1967, the club currently participates in Victorian State League Division 2 South-East, Victorian Churches Football Association divisions and Football Victoria Junior and MiniRoos leagues. The club plays its home games at Anderson Park.

Its most successful period was in the 1990s, during which it spent the majority of the decade in Division 1 of the State League. In 1994 the club were crowned champions of Division 1 and subsequently promoted to the Victorian Premier League. However, after only one season in Victoria’s top flight they were immediately relegated after finishing second last in the league.

Tuesday 8″‘ November 1966 dawned with the preparations in place. The Athenaeum Hall in Doncaster had been booked for 8.00 p.m., the Victorian Soccer Federation had guaranteed the as yet unnamed and unformed club a position in the 4th Division and it was a balmy spring night. Eight o’clock came and went and I began to think that the whole idea of forming a soccer club in the Doncaster area had been a mistake. Around ten past eight a head appeared around the door and asked was this the place where the meeting was, to be quickly followed by another body appearing out of the darkness. Within a few minutes approximately 12 more people arrived and the meeting was under way. I explained the purpose of the meeting and after a number of questions over various issues a motion was put forward and approved that a soccer club be formed in Doncaster and that the Shire President, Mr. Stan Shepherd, be approached to be the President of the club, John Dunkley to be Vice President, Ray Shew to be Secretary and Colin Mainwaring to be Treasurer, with the remit to meet in a month’s time.

At the inaugural meeting were a number of individuals who still have close connections with the club today.

Stan Shepherd agreed to be the President and a meeting was held two weeks later at his home in Park Orchards, which in those days was considered out in the country. He agreed to liaise with the council to obtain suitable playing facilities and as luck would have it a new pavilion was being completed at the bottom end of Donvale Reserve (currently the home of the football club) and so the soccer club became the first tenant. Dealing with the council employees in regard to two pitches (one each for Seniors/Juniors) proved to be more difficult as no one at the council had ever seen a soccer pitch, let alone mark one out. From the meeting at Stan Shepherd’s house, it was also agreed to run two junior teams in 1967 and to appoint David Martin as the seniors playing coach. Final negotiations for his transfer from Alexander for $200 were concluded in a fish and chip shop in Northcote.

The next few weeks were hectic as training sessions were arranged, players signed andfriendly matches arranged as preparations were made for our first match at home toMooroolbark on 25thMarch. There was only one problem – our pitch wouldn’t be ready in time and Mooroolbark were unable to use their pitch until the cricket season finished. After much soul searching we arranged to use a pitch at a school in Bayswater. Upon our arrival at the ground on the Saturday for the game, not only could it be described as a paddock, but the pitch was not marked and there were no goal posts. Eventually wefound the store room and proceeded to do all the necessary things to enable the Reserve game to kick off at 1.00 p.m. I should also add at this juncture that ourdesignated colours of gold with green shorts had been abandoned as no shirt maker in Australia made gold tops and to order them from England would have taken too long. So the colours in the first season were changed to green shirts and white shorts. There was also a delay in obtaining the green shirts so for the first fixture we played in all white. The reserve team, not unexpectedly, were no match for the experienced Mooroolbark team, but when the senior team scored in the first minute of the game the picture looked brighter until 3-1 down at half time and a 6-2 loss at full time brought us back down to earth. The following week we went to Rosebud where we won 8-1, such were the uneven results of the first season.

Many vivid memories still remain to those who were involved with the club in its debut season, but two particular games stand out. The game against North Carlton Olympic away early in the season brought headlines on the front page of the Melbourne newspapers for the wrong reason with the referee abandoning the game because of continual foul tactics of North Carlton Olympic. A far more serious event with this club took place in 1976 but more of that in a later article. The return game away at Mooroolbark proved to be one of the most exciting games in Doncaster’s history. Doncaster scored in the first minute, only to concede five goals before half time and our goalkeeper had been carried off with fractured ribs. An amazing 20 minute spell in the second half saw Doncaster score five goals to lead 6-5, but only for Mooroolbark to equalize with the last kick of the game to give a result of a 6-6 draw.

The Junior section during the initial season flourished with many more teams being formed, which brought about coaching and playing facility problems, but these were gradually overcome.

From such small beginnings in 1967 the club has grown to where it is today, thanks to the many people who have assisted the club over the years and to the dedicated band of people who week in week out keep the club running.

Honours 
Victorian State League Division 2 South-East Champions: 1
2012
Victorian State League Division 2 South-East runner-up: 1
2009
Victorian State League Division 3 South-East runner-up: 1
2003
Victorian State League Division 1: 1
1994
Victorian Metropolitan League Division 4: 2
1975, 1977
Victorian Metropolitan League Division 3 runner-up: 1
1978

External links 

Doncaster Rovers on OzFootball

Association football clubs established in 1967
Soccer clubs in Melbourne
Victorian State League teams
1967 establishments in Australia
Sport in the City of Manningham